La Grange is an unincorporated community located in the town of La Grange, Walworth County, Wisconsin, United States. La Grange is located on U.S. Route 12. The community was named after the manor of Marquis de la Fayette. "La Grange" is French for "the barn."

Images

References

Unincorporated communities in Walworth County, Wisconsin
Unincorporated communities in Wisconsin